The Bodongpa or Bodong tradition, is one of the smaller traditions of Tibetan Buddhism falling outside the classification of the four main schools.

History
Bodong E Monastery, located in Yutok, in modern Tashigang, Lhatse County, was the main monastery of the Bodong tradition. It was first established in 1049 by the Kadam (Tibetan Buddhism) teacher Mudra Chenpo.

Bodong tradition itself goes back to Bodong Rinchen Tsemo, who received teachings from Drubthob Semo Chewa. Its most renowned figure, often regarded as its founder, was the Bodong Penchen Lénam Gyelchok (1376-1451), whose seat was at this monastery.  Bodong Penchen authored over one hundred and thirty-five volumes and is known as the most prolific writer in Tibetan history. His most famous work is the Compendium of Suchness  comprising one hundred and thirty-three volumes having about 500 folios (1000 pages) in each. The extensive version contains one hundred and ten volumes; the medium version, twenty volumes; the condensed version, two volumes; and the extremely condensed version, one volume and this encyclopaedic work is considered the foundation of the tradition.

Je Tsongkhapa studied at Bodong E Monastery with the Lotsawa Namkha Zangpo, who taught him the Mirror of Poetry.

A well-known tulku of this tradition is Samding Dorje Phagmo, one of the few female incarnation lineages of Tibetan Buddhism.

Religious establishments
Bodong E Gonpa was almost completely destroyed during the Cultural Revolution  though some parts survived because it had been turned into a granary.

Nönga Abbey, in modern Tingri County, Shigatse, Tibet Autonomous Region.

Chöde Monastery, Nyêmo County, Lhasa. Founded in 750, converted to the Bodong school in 1250.

Pelmo Chöding in Nyalam County, Shigatse, Tibet Autonomous Region.

Outside Tibet
In 1989 the Pelmo Choding monastery (Porong Gompa) in exile was established at Dharamsala, India. A Porong Pelmo Choding monastery has also been built in Kathmandu, Nepal. These monasteries were established by Tibetans from the Porong region of southwest Tibet to preserve the Bodong tradition.

See also
 Samding Monastery

References

Sources

Further reading

External links
 Bodong Research and Publication Centre

 
Schools of Tibetan Buddhism